Anwar Ali (born 25 November 1987) is a Pakistani cricketer who has represented his country in One Day Internationals and T20 Internationals. He was also part of the 2006 Under-19 Cricket World Cup winning team, putting in a man-of-the-match performance in the final against India. He represents Karachi Zebras and Sindh Dolphins in the domestic arena. He plays for Multan Sultans in the PSL 8.

Early and domestic career
Anwar Ali is a resident of Karachi, Sindh. He belongs to a Pashtun family of Swat. He was born in Khwazakhela and he migrated to Karachi as a child. He spent his early years as a factory labourer, ironing socks.
He is playing as a professional for Colne Cricket Club in Lancashire, England, in the Lancashire League. He joined North Down Cricket Club in Northern Ireland for the 2012 season as the club professional.

In April 2018, he was named in Balochistan's squad for the 2018 Pakistan Cup. In March 2019, he was named in Punjab's squad for the 2019 Pakistan Cup.

In July 2019, he was selected to play for the Rotterdam Rhinos in the inaugural edition of the Euro T20 Slam cricket tournament. However, the following month the tournament was cancelled.

In September 2019, he was named in Sindh's squad for the 2019–20 Quaid-e-Azam Trophy tournament. In November 2021, he was selected to play for the Galle Gladiators following the players' draft for the 2021 Lanka Premier League.

Under-19 World Cup
Anwar Ali led a great comeback win for Pakistan against India in the 2006 Under-19 Cricket World Cup. He took five wickets, including Rohit Sharma, with an inswinger that bowled him. He also took the wicket of Ravindra Jadeja. Both of these players have played for the senior national side in the One Day Internationals. His 5 for 35 performance won him the Man of the Match accolade.

International career
Anwar Ali made his T20 debut for Pakistan on 12 October 2008, against Zimbabwe. He bowled 2 overs and went for 19 runs without taking a wicket. Anwar made his comeback against Zimbabwe as well, where he took 2 wickets in both matches. Pakistan won the series 2–0. After good form against Zimbabwe and in domestic matches, he got an ODI cap and scored 43 not out; he also took 2–26 in 6 overs. Together he and Bilawal Bhatti defeated South Africa. He also made a fine 41 not out in an ODI against Sri Lanka and took a wicket in the match. Only in his first One Day International, Anwar Ali promised to be a good player as he was able to win the Man Of The Match award.

During the second match of the T20I series against Sri Lanka on 2015 August in Colombo, Ali smashed a match-winning knock of unbeaten 46 runs, where Pakistan won a game when they were nowhere near a winning margin. Sri Lanka batted first and scored 172 runs in 20 overs. The score showed a win for the Sri Lankans, due to difficulty to bat in the second innings in their home soil of Colombo. Pakistan came on to bat and with first five wickets gone for just 40 runs on the board. For the sixth wicket, skipper Shahid Afridi smashed a quick 45 runs off 22 balls and the match turned again to the Pakistanis. After Afridi's wicket, the Lankans were back in the game, when Ali came in to the crease. He showed immense talent and was hard-hitting against the Sri Lankan pace attack and scored a blistering 46 runs off 17 balls with 3 fours and 4 huge sixes. Ali got out in the score of 165 runs and finally Pakistan won comfortably with 1 wicket. This is Pakistan's first T20I win in a narrow margin of wickets. Ali was named the man of the match award and Pakistan won the series 2–0.

References

External links
Twitter Official Page
Instagram Official Page
Youtube Official Channel
Cricinfo: Anwar Ali

1987 births
Living people
Pakistani cricketers
Pakistan One Day International cricketers
Pakistan Twenty20 International cricketers
Karachi cricketers
Karachi Dolphins cricketers
Karachi Urban cricketers
Karachi Zebras cricketers
Karachi Blues cricketers
Pakistan International Airlines cricketers
Pashtun people
Sindh cricketers
People from Swat District
Cricketers from Karachi
Quetta Gladiators cricketers
Dambulla Aura cricketers
Galle Gladiators cricketers